The 1989–90 UC Irvine Anteaters men's basketball team represented the University of California, Irvine during the 1989-90 NCAA Division I men's basketball season. The Anteaters were led by tenth year head coach Bill Mulligan and played their home games at the Bren Events Center. They were members of the Big West Conference. They finished the season 5–23 and 3–13 in Big West play. They advanced to the Big West Conference tournament where they lost to the Cal State Fullerton Titans.

Previous season
The 1988–89 UC Irvine Anteaters men's basketball team finished the season 12–17 and 8th in Big West play with a conference record of 8–10.

Roster

Schedule

|-
!colspan=9 style=|Non-Conference Season

|-
!colspan=9 style=|Conference Season

|-
!colspan=9 style=| Big West Conference  tournament

|-

Source

Awards and honors
Dylan Rigdon
Big West Freshman All-Conference
Jeff Von Lutzow
Big West Freshman All-Conference

Source:

References

UC Irvine Anteaters men's basketball seasons
UC Irvine
UC Irvine Anteaters
UC Irvine Anteaters